Identity on Fire is the third studio album by American post-hardcore band A Skylit Drive, released on February 15, 2011.

Production and recording
On his Formspring account, Jagmin predicted that A Skylit Drive would begin writing and recording a follow-up to Adelphia during Summer 2010. He also suggested that the album would see an early 2011 release.

In February 2010, Hassle Records published on their web site, "We have new recruits to the Hassle Records family, please welcome A Skylit Drive with open arms... Fresh out of California, A Skylit Drive have been together in their current line-up since 2007 and have been touring their unique brand of metalcore across the US. We released their second album Adelphia in October and the UK joined the ever growing A Skylit Drive bandwagon. Catch the band on the rapidly selling out UK / Europe tour with Alesana in April."

The band announced via MySpace that on May 29, 2010, the band Desires of Sires will debut on their Adelphia tour. Recently, Michael Jagmin hinted on Twitter that A Skylit Drive is currently writing new material. A Skylit Drive is recording new demos. The band's MySpace layout changed in July 2010 with a new message saying that A Skylit Drive was in the studio recording a new album with Cameron Webb for early 2011.

According to the band's Twitter account, they finished recording the new album. According to Nick Miller's Twitter, a twitpic of a promotional poster confirmed the album's name Identity On Fire, which was set to be released sometime in February 2011.

On November 15, 2010, the band revealed cover art from the album and confirmed the production for Cameron Webb (Silverstein, Flyleaf, 30 Seconds To Mars).

The first song revealed from the album was "Ex Marks the Spot". Michael Jagmin considered it his favorite song off the album. On December 7, 2010, the band announced the track listing for the album and a date set on February 15, 2011. On January 5, 2011 via Twitter, Michael Jagmin announced a new song coming out on January 11. "XO Skeleton" was released online January 11 on the band's Facebook page.

The second single and music video for "Too Little Too Late" premiered on January 24 on iTunes. The third official single "Ex Marks the Spot" was released the same day as the album, February 15. The song was made available for download in the Rock Band Network on Xbox 360 for 160 Microsoft Points. It features vocal harmonies and pro keys.

On February 10 the album began streaming on PureVolume.com.

The album debuted at number 98 on the Billboard 200.

It's the last album to feature original lead guitarist Joey Wilson, who left the band in 2012.

Track listing
All lyrics written by Michael Jagmin and Nick Miller.

Charts

Personnel 

A Skylit Drive
Michael "Jag" Jagmin - Lead vocals
Joey Wilson - Lead guitar
Nick Miller - Rhythm guitar
Brian White - unclean vocals, Bass
Cory La Quay - Drums, backing unclean vocals
Kyle Simmons - Keyboards, programming

Production
Produced & mixed by Cameron Webb, @ Maple Studios, Orange County, California
Engineered by Cameron Webb & Sergio Chavez
Mastered by Alan Douches, @ West West Side Music, New Windsor, New York
A&R by Shervon Esfahani
Management by Eric Rushing & Shawn Carrano (The Artery Foundation)
Artwork by Phill Mamula
Symbol designed by Skull With Hair
Band photo by Brook Pifer

References

2011 albums
A Skylit Drive albums
Fearless Records albums
Hassle Records albums